Dylan Borge (born 15 October 2003) is a Gibraltarian semi-professional footballer who plays as a striker for Europa and the Gibraltar national football team.

International career
Borge made his international debut for Gibraltar on 27 March 2021 in a 2022 FIFA World Cup qualifying game against Montenegro. At 17 years and 163 days, he became the youngest Gibraltar international of the UEFA era, breaking the record set by Jayce Olivero in March 2016 by 101 days.

References

2003 births
Living people
Gibraltarian footballers
Gibraltar international footballers
Association football defenders
Europa F.C. players
Lincoln Red Imps F.C. players
Gibraltar National League players
Gibraltar under-21 international footballers
Gibraltar youth international footballers